Originally identified as Kirsten ras associated gene (krag), Sarcospan (SSPN) is a 25-kDa transmembrane protein located in the dystrophin-associated protein complex of skeletal muscle cells, where it is most abundant. It contains four transmembrane spanning helices with both N- and C-terminal domains located intracellularly.    Loss of SSPN expression occurs in patients with Duchenne muscular dystrophy. Dystrophin is required for proper localization of SSPN.  SSPN is also an essential regulator of Akt signaling pathways. Without SSPN, Akt signaling pathways will be hindered and muscle regeneration will not occur.

Sarcospan in Muscular Dystrophy 
The loss of dystrophin results in muscular dystrophy. SSPN upregulates the levels of Utrophin-glycoprotein complex (UGC) to make up for the loss of dystrophin in the neuromuscular junction. Sarcoglycans bind to SSPN and form the SG-SSPN complex, which interacts with dystroglycans (DG) and Utrophin leading to the formation of the UGC.  SSPN regulates the amount of Utrophin produced by the UGC to restore laminin binding due to the absence of dystrophin.  If laminin binding is not restored by SSPN, contraction of the membrane is present.  In dystrophic mdx mice, SSPN increases levels of Utrophin and restores the levels of laminin binding, reducing the symptoms of muscular dystrophy

References

External links